Thomas Stewart (born 9 January 1990) is a British former racing cyclist, who rode professionally between 2013 and 2020 for five British UCI Continental teams.

Major results

2013
 2nd Premier Calendar
 4th Overall Tour of the Reservoir
 4th Beaumont Trophy
2014
 2nd Arno Wallaard Memorial
2015
 2nd Beaumont Trophy
 8th Arnhem–Veenendaal Classic
2016
 1st Velothon Wales
 1st Lincoln Grand Prix
 8th Dwars door het Hageland
2017
 1st  Overall Tour of the Reservoir
 1st Stage 5 Szlakiem Walk Majora Hubala
 3rd Beaumont Trophy
 6th Overall Dubai Tour
2018
 1st  Overall Tour de Normandie
 7th Rutland–Melton CiCLE Classic
 8th Road race, Commonwealth Games
 8th Overall New Zealand Cycle Classic
 9th Poreč Trophy
2019
 1st Lincoln Grand Prix
 2nd Slag om Norg
 8th Circuit de Wallonie

References

External links

British male cyclists
Living people
1990 births
Cyclists at the 2018 Commonwealth Games
Commonwealth Games competitors for England